Victor Mário Barcellos Borges (26 June 1942 – 5 December 2009) was a Brazilian volleyball player who competed in the 1964 Summer Olympics and in the 1968 Summer Olympics. He played on the teams which won a gold medal at the 1963 Pan American Games and a silver medal at the 1967 Pan American Games. He was born in Rio de Janeiro, Brazil.

References

1942 births
2009 deaths
Brazilian men's volleyball players
Olympic volleyball players of Brazil
Volleyball players at the 1964 Summer Olympics
Volleyball players at the 1968 Summer Olympics
Volleyball players at the 1963 Pan American Games
Volleyball players at the 1967 Pan American Games
Pan American Games gold medalists for Brazil
Pan American Games silver medalists for Brazil
Pan American Games medalists in volleyball
Medalists at the 1963 Pan American Games
Medalists at the 1967 Pan American Games
Volleyball players from Rio de Janeiro (city)